Choi Yong-hee (born 25 June 1971) is a South Korean alpine skier. He competed in five events at the 1992 Winter Olympics.

References

1971 births
Living people
South Korean male alpine skiers
Olympic alpine skiers of South Korea
Alpine skiers at the 1992 Winter Olympics
Place of birth missing (living people)
20th-century South Korean people